This is a list of Norwegian television related events from 2007.

Events
23 November - Rapper Tshawe Baqwa and his partner Maria Sandvik win the third series of Skal vi danse?.
21 December - Glenn Lyse wins the fifth series of Idol.

Debuts

Television shows

2000s
Skal vi danse? (2006–present)

Ending this year
Idol (2003-2007, 2011–present)

Births

Deaths

See also
2007 in Norway